Ligustrum × ibolium, called the north privet or ibolium privet, is a hybrid species of flowering plant in the genus Ligustrum, the result of a cross between Ligustrum obtusifolium (border privet) and Ligustrum ovalifolium (Korean privet). It is probably the most common privet used for hedging in the United States.

References

ibolium
Interspecific plant hybrids
Ornamental plant cultivars
Plants described in 1921